A superstition is "a belief or practice resulting from ignorance, fear of the unknown, trust in magic or chance, or a false conception of causation" or "an irrational abject attitude of mind toward the supernatural, nature, or God resulting from superstition." Often, it arises from ignorance, a misunderstanding of science or causality, a belief in fate or magic, or fear of that which is unknown. It is commonly applied to beliefs and practices surrounding luck, prophecy, and certain spiritual beings, particularly the belief that future events can be foretold by specific (apparently) unrelated prior events. The word superstition is often used to refer to a religion not practiced by the majority of a given society regardless of whether the prevailing religion contains alleged superstitions.

Global

 Chain letter
 Exorcism
 Exorcism in Christianity
 Exorcism in Islam
 List of lucky symbols
 List of unlucky symbols
 Superstitions in Muslim societies
 Superstition in Judaism
 Sailors' superstitions
 Sports-related curses
 Theatrical superstitions

Number related

Number of the Beast
11:11
4
Four-leaf clover
7 
Seventh son of a seventh son
8
9
13
Friday the 13th
The Thirteen Club
Thirteenth floor
108
111
666 (Number of the Beast)
Ace of spades
 Tetraphobia
 Triskaidekaphobia
 27 Club

Africa

Buda
Gris-gris
Sampy
Sleeping child

Americas

Ascalapha odorata
Carranca
Curupira
Djucu
Fortune cookie
Knocking on wood
I'noGo tied
Spilling salt
White lighter myth
Witch window

Asia

India, Pakistan, and Bangladesh

Bhoot (ghost)
Chashme Baddoor
Chhaupadi
Churel
Dhat syndrome
Ghosts in Bengali culture
Hindu milk miracle
Jackal's horn
Miracle Chapati
Muhurta
Mumbai sweet seawater incident
Navaratna
Nazar battu
Pichal Peri
Puppy pregnancy syndrome

China

Jin Chan
Numbers in Chinese culture

Japan

Akabeko
Kanai Anzen
Maneki-neko
Okiagari-koboshi
Omamori

Korea

Fan death

Philippines

Agimat
Albularyo
Barang
Kulam
Lihi
Pagtatawas
Pasma
Usog

Thailand

Kuman Thong
Palad khik
Takrut
Nang Kwak

Other

Russian traditions and superstitions
Curse of 39

Europe 

Barbary macaques in Gibraltar
Blarney Stone
Cimaruta
Cornicello
Goodman's Croft
In bocca al lupo
Kitchen witch
Knocking on wood
Nazar
Painted pebbles
Rabbit rabbit rabbit
Ravens of the Tower of London
Spilling salt
Spilling water for luck
Troll cross
Tycho Brahe days
Witch post
Wolfssegen

See also 
 Luck
 Omen
 Curse

Notes

References

Further reading

External links

 Where Superstitions Come From: slideshow by Life magazine
Superstitions in Russia

 
Superstitions